The Prairie Wrestling Alliance (PWA, formerly Prairie Wrestling Association) is an independent wrestling promotion based in Edmonton, Alberta, Canada, since 2001. The PWA is co-owned, operated, and promoted by Kurt Sorochan. Lance Storm is a former booker with the promotion.

History
The PWA was established in March 2001 by Kurt Sorochan, Tex Gaines, and Hercules Ayala. Their first shows were outside of Edmonton due to the difficulty of getting a promoter's license. Their first show in Edmonton drew over 700 people.

In 2003, they put on monthly events, which got mostly good reviews. The following year in 2004, however, they put on fewer shows due to scheduling conflicts. The company relaunched its shows in October 2004 with Night of Champions.

The PWA currently runs shows monthly in Edmonton, AB at the Northgate Lions Senior Recreation Center & Calgary, AB at the Century Casino. On January 20, 2014, the PWA announced that they would start running shows in Red Deer, AB on May 22, 2014. On May 31, 2014 the PWA ran its first show in Lloydminster Sask/Ab.

Roster

Current Active Roster

Michael Allen Richard Clark (PWA Champion)
Shaun Moore 
"The Thickness" Reid Matthews (PWA Mayhem Champion)

Brandon Van Danielson 
"God's Gift to Wrestling" Michael Richard Blais
Jack Pride 
"The Omen" Gabriel Lestat
Mephisto
Sheik Akbar Shabaz
Chris Steele
Kenneth Anthony
Jeff Tyler
Bobby Sharp 
Kenny Stryker (PWA Tag Team Champion)
Aiden Adams (PWA Tag Team Champion)
Colton Kelly
"Kid Chocolate" Mo Jabari 
Nightmare
The Titan
"Spaceman" Beri Grayson
Maxton Flexwell
El Asesino

Women
Kat Von Heez
Zoë Sager
Gigi Ray
Taryn from Accounting

Managers
Dr. Kyoto - Millennial Rebels
Thaddeus Archer III - M.A.R.C & Andy Anderson

Factions

The Western Lions: Michael Richard Blais/Brandon Van Danielson
The Millennial Rebels: Kenneth Anthony/Colton Kelly/Dr. Kyoto
The Above Average Joes: Kenny Stryker/Aiden Adams/Zoë Sager

Staff

Referees
Michael "The Fitz" Fitzpatrick
Robert Young
Gregory Thomas

Announcers
What About Ivan
Big Bad Boris

Commissioners
Edmonton: Thaddeus Archer III
Calgary: Duke Durrango

Alumni

Male wrestlers

Abdullah the Butcher
Booker T
Bully Ray
Bushwacker Luke
Colt Cabana
Christian Cage
Johnny Devine
Devon
Mick Foley
Teddy Hart
Homicide
Frankie Kazarian
Jay Lethal
Jim "The Anvil" Neidhart
Samoa Joe
Tiger Singh(Jinder Mahal)
Harry Smith
Al Snow
A.J. Styles
TJ Wilson
Apoc
Mattias Wild
Lance Storm
Ravenous Randy
Rohan Raja
Amir Jordan
Brett Morgan

Female wrestlers

Nattie Neidhart
Velvet Sky
Angelina Love
Maria Kanellis
Mickie James
KC Cassidy
Krysta Lynn Scott
Rachael Ellering
Gisele Shaw

PWA Hall of Fame
The PWA Hall of Fame is a professional wrestling hall of fame maintained by the Prairie Wrestling Alliance. It was established in 2008 to honor select wrestling personalities, mostly alumni of the Edmonton-based promotion. The induction ceremony for the Class of 2008, the inaugural inductees into the Hall of Fame, took place at the PWA's "Night of Champions VI" held at the NAIT Gymnasium on June 20, 2008. Duke Durango, a longtime "journeyman" wrestler and former PWA Champion, led the class, which included Stampede Wrestling mainstays Hercules Ayala, The Cuban Assassin, The Great Gama and Gerry Morrow.

 – Entries without a birth name indicates that the inductee did not perform under a ring name.
 – This section mainly lists the major accomplishments of each inductee in the promotion.

Current champions

References

External links
PWA Official Website

2001 establishments in Alberta
Canadian professional wrestling promotions
Professional wrestling in Alberta